The Donald Barger House, at 2972 Front St., at the corner of Main St., in Petersburg, Boone County, Kentucky, was listed on the National Register of Historic Places in 1989.

It was deemed significant "as a good and particularly well-preserved representative of approximately a dozen hall-parlor cottages in Petersburg, and of the ten hall-parlor houses surveyed in the rest of Boone County."

References

Houses on the National Register of Historic Places in Kentucky
Houses in Boone County, Kentucky
Hall-parlor plan architecture
National Register of Historic Places in Boone County, Kentucky